Cicinnobolus is a genus of fungi, either classified as imperfect fungi or as Ascomycota.  Species in this genus are hyperparasites of powdery mildew.

Cicinnobolus cesatii is a synonym for Ampelomyces quisqualis.

References 

  Eurotium, Erysiphe, Cicinnobolus: nebst Bemerkungen uber die Geschlectsorgane der Ascomycetes. A Bary, 1870
 An overwintering pycnidial stage of Cicinnobolus. CE Yarwood, Mycologia, 1939

External links 

 Cicinnobolus at mycobank

Phaeosphaeriaceae
Dothideomycetes genera
Parasitic fungi
Parasites of fungi
Hyperparasites